Livewire is a kids' talk show on the U.S. television cable network, Nickelodeon which began in September 1980 and ended in 1985. The series was designed for kids of all ages, and the show's main focus discussed true current events and stories during those times. It was taped at the Ed Sullivan Theater in New York through Reeves Teletape Studios of Sesame Street fame. It was filmed "live on tape" with a participating audience of about 20-30 teenagers  and was hosted initially by Mark Cordray, but Fred Newman soon replaced Cordray as host. It was a CableACE Award winner, the first Nickelodeon talk show to achieve that feat. Livewire was the #1 rated show on Nickelodeon in 1982, and never went below #7 in the ratings during the 5-year span of the show.

The show was most famously known for giving relatively unknown bands and singers their first television appearance. Bands and celebrities who appeared on the program include:

List of guests
 Adam Abeshouse
 Afrika Bambaataa
 Aileen Quinn – From Annie
 Adam Yauch - From Beastie Boys 
 Albert Hague – From Fame
 Alex Tannous – Psychic
 Average White Band – Rock Band
 Bill Irwin – Actor
 Billy Squier
 Blotto – Rock Band
 Bow Wow Wow – Musical Group
 Buckner & Garcia
 Caian Devora –  Actor
 Carlene Carter – Singer
 Carroll Righter – Astrologer
 Chris Atkins –  Actor
 Comateens – Rock Band
 David Liederman
 DJ Jazzy Jay – Rapper
 Dr. Michael Carrera – Author
 Edward Bush – Director Of The Museum Of Holography
 Erin Grey – Actor
 Errol Manoff And The Fantasy Factory
 Eubie Blake
 Frank Zappa
 Fred Newman – Voice Actor
 Garland Jeffreys (Singer)
 Gene Roddenberry – Creator of Star Trek
 Geri Jewell – From The Facts Of Life
 Graham Nash – Singer
 Grey Panthers
 Haircut 100 - Musical Group
 Jack "Hacksaw" Reynolds– Linebacker, San Francisco 49ers
 Jackie Torrence – Storyteller
 James Bethea
 James Earl Jones – Actor
 Jennifer Gatti – Actor
 Jimmy Baio
 Joffrey Ballet Concert Group
 John Hurt
 John E. Mack – Psychiatrist
 Jordan Walker-Pearlman
 June Foray – Voice Actor
 KISS– Rock Band
 Laurie Anderson - performance artist, singer
 Lazoo
 Lee Curreri – From Fame
 Little Steven & The Disciples Of Soul
 Lords Of The New Church – Musical Group
 Manowar
 Mark Cordray
 Mark Wilson – Magician
 Marty Feldman
 Merri Wood – Physicist
 Molly Picon
 Mummenschanz - Theater Company
 Novo Combo
 Paul Reiser – Actor
 Phil Paul Call
 The Pink Ladies – From Grease 2
 Psychedelic Furs – Musical Group
 R.E.M. – Rock Band
 The Ramones– Rock Band
 Ray Williams – Manager Of Six Flags Over Texas
 Rene Teboe
 Ricky Schroder – From Silver Spoons
 Robert Duvall
 Robert Truax
 Ronnie Dyson – Singer
 Ronnie Lamm – PTA Council President
 Rudolf Of Danceteria – October 30, 1983
 Split Enz
 Stanley Jarocki – Mktg. V.P. Bally Midway
 Stephanie Mills
 Sugar Hill Gang– Rappers
 Teresa de Rose and Andrew Needhammer - From American Ballet Theatre II
 Tom Savini – Special Effect Makeup Artist
 The Tom Tom Club – Rock Band
 Triumph - Mike Levine
 Twisted Sister – Rock Band
 Valerie Harper – The Hunger Project
 Valerie Landsburg – From Fame
 The Cast of You Can't Do That On Television

References 

 Maximum Metal: When Manowar and Nickelodeon Collided- Transcript of Manowar's Appearance on Livewire.
 Twisted Sister play "The Kids Are Back" + Interview

External links 
 
 Classic Nickelodeon Fan Blog  * 

1980s Nickelodeon original programming
1980s American television talk shows
1980 American television series debuts
1985 American television series endings